Erethistoides cavatura is a species of South Asian river catfish endemic to Nepal where it is found in the Rapi River system of Narayani River basin.  This species grows to a length of  SL.

References
 

Erethistidae
Fish of Asia
Taxa named by Heok Hee Ng
Taxa named by David R. Edds
Fish described in 2005